David Millin (11 June 1920 - 26 May 1999) was a South African film director, cinematographer and film producer. He has produced various Afrikaans and English films about his career. He has been a member of the American Society of Cinematographers since 1972, the first member from South Africa belonging to the organization. In 1994 he was honored by M-Net for his lifetime contribution to the industry and in 1997 he was also honored by SASC / Kodak for his contribution. He was famous for his spectacular depictions, large (but precise) war scenes and his dry sense of humor.

Filmography 
As director:
 Suster Teresa, 1974
 Die Voortrekkers, 1973
 Met Moed, Durf en Bloed, 1973
 Die Banneling, 1971
 Shangani Patrol, 1970
 Banana Beach, 1970
 Petticoat Safari, 1969
 Majuba: Heuwel van Duiwe, 1968
 The Second Sin, 1966
 African Gold, 1965 
 Seven Against the Sun, 1964
 Stropers van die Laeveld, 1962
 Donker Afrika, 1957
 Last of the Few (year unknown)

As a cinematographer:
 Killer Force, 1976
 Die Banneling, 1971
 The Jackals, 1967
 The Cape Town Affair, 1967
 Diamond Safari, 1958
 Donker Afrika, 1957
 'n Plan is 'n Boerdery, 1954 
 Inspan, 1953
 Hans-die-Skipper, 1952
 Last of the Few

As manufacturer:
 Die Voortrekkers, 1973
 Met Moed, Durf en Bloed, 1973
 Shangani Patrol, 1970
 Banana Beach, 1970
 Seven Against the Sun, 1964
 Last of the Few

As scriptwriter:
 Met Moed, Durf en Bloed, 1973
 African Gold, 1965
 Seven Against the Sun, 1964
 Last of the Few

References

1920 births
1999 deaths
South African film directors
South African cinematographers
South African film producers